With the Tenors of Our Time is an album by Roy Hargrove.

Track listing 
 "Soppin' the Biscuit" (composer Roy Hargrove, featuring Stanley Turrentine) – 	7:59
 "When We Were One" (composer Johnny Griffin, featuring Johnny Griffin) – 	5:59
 "Valse Hot" (composer Sonny Rollins, featuring Branford Marsalis, Ron Blake) – 	6:57
 "Once Forgotten" (composer Pamela Watson, featuring Ron Blake on tenor and soprano saxophone) – 	5:45
 "Shade of Jade" (composer Joe Henderson, featuring Joe Henderson) – 	5:24
 "Greens at the Chicken Shack" (composer Cyrus Chestnut, featuring Johnny Griffin) – 	5:45
 "Never Let Me Go" (composer Jay Livingston and Ray Evans, featuring Rodney Whitaker) – 	5:36
 "Serenity" (composer Joe Henderson, featuring Joe Henderson) – 	5:35
 "Across the Pond" (composer Roy Hargrove, featuring Joshua Redman) – 	6:47
 "Wild Is Love" (composer Robert Mickens and G. Brown, featuring Stanley Turrentine) – 	6:50
 "Mental Phrasing" (composer Roy Hargrove, featuring Ron Blake, Joshua Redman) – 	6:25
 "April's Fool" (composer Ron Blake) – 	3:54

Personnel 
Musicians
 Roy Hargrove  – trumpet, Flugelhorn, production
Ron Blake  – soprano, tenor saxophone
Cyrus Chestnut  – piano
Johnny Griffin  – tenor saxophone
Joe Henderson  – tenor saxophone
Gregory Hutchinson  – drums
Branford Marsalis  – tenor saxophone
Joshua Redman  – tenor saxophone
Stanley Turrentine  – tenor saxophone
Rodney Whitaker  – bass

Production
Larry Clothier  – production, engineering, mixing
Robert Friedrich  – assistant engineering
Troy Halderson  – mastering
Jimmy Katz  – liner notes
David Lau  – art direction, design
James Minchin  – photography
Nelly Muganda  – make-up, hair stylist
Ed Rak  – engineering, mastering, mixing
Richard Seidel  – executive production
Camille Tominaro  – production coordination

References 

1994 albums
Roy Hargrove albums